Lyuben Gurgushinov (born 2 November 1931) is a Bulgarian athlete. He competed in the men's triple jump at the 1964 Summer Olympics.

References

1931 births
Living people
Athletes (track and field) at the 1964 Summer Olympics
Bulgarian male triple jumpers
Olympic athletes of Bulgaria
Place of birth missing (living people)